State Route 159 (SR 159) is a northeast-southwest state highway (signed north–south) in the south-central portion of the U.S. state of Ohio.

History
SR 159 was original signed in 1923, on much of its current alignment. In 1927 the route was extended south to US 23, along the alignment of former State Route 27. The first section of road paved was in 1933 and it was a section from the southern terminus to Meade. In 1935 the second section was paved between Meade and Tarlton. The final section of the roadway was paved between Tarlton and the northern terminus, in 1938. The route was extended north to its current terminus along the former alignment of U.S. Route 22, in 1971. In 1972 the highway was extended south to its current terminus along the former alignment of U.S. Route 23.

A construction project in Ross County added two roundabouts at a new intersection with SR 207 and the intersection of SR 180. Construction began in October 2019 and was completed the following October.

Major intersections

References

159
Transportation in Ross County, Ohio
Transportation in Pickaway County, Ohio
Transportation in Fairfield County, Ohio